State Trunk Highway 162 (often called Highway 162, STH-162 or WIS 162) is a state highway in the U.S. state of Wisconsin. It runs in north–south in southwest Wisconsin from Stoddard to Four Corners.

Route description
The highway starts at its intersection with Highway 33 and Division Street in Stoddard and runs east along Coon Creek. After a concurrency with County Highway K, the highway goes through Chaseburg and continues northeast. The highway runs along a short concurrency with US 14 and US 61. This short concurrency is a wrong-way concurrency because WIS 162 and US 61 are signed in opposing directions throughout its length. Just west of Coon Valley, the wrong-way concurrency ends as the highway runs north from it.

After , the highway enters a concurrency Highway 33, which ends at Middle Ridge, which the highway runs north from. After its intersection with County Highway JB, the highway runs along Dutch Creek. It interchanges with I-90 before entering Bangor. After a short concurrency with County Highway B, the highway runs north from Bangor. It enters a short concurrency with Highway 16 before following Burns Creek. From the creek's end, the highway continues north until it terminates at Highway 71 in Four Corners.

Major intersections
This table lists the major intersections along Highway 162.

See also

References

External links

162
Transportation in Vernon County, Wisconsin
Transportation in La Crosse County, Wisconsin
Transportation in Monroe County, Wisconsin